Matvey Andreyevich Ivakhnov (born 21 July 2003) is a Russian football player who plays for FC Fakel Voronezh.

Club career
He made his debut in the Russian Premier League for FC Fakel Voronezh on 24 July 2022 in a game against FC Akhmat Grozny.

Career statistics

References

External links
 
 
 
 

2003 births
People from Volzhsky, Volgograd Oblast
Sportspeople from Volgograd Oblast
Living people
Russian footballers
Russia youth international footballers
Association football forwards
FC Fakel Voronezh players
Russian Second League players
Russian Premier League players
Russian expatriate footballers
Expatriate footballers in Latvia
Russian expatriate sportspeople in Latvia